Deconica alpestris is a species of mushroom in the family Strophariaceae. Its holotype was found by Rolf Singer in 1979 growing on calcareous soil at an elevation of 1900 meters in the alps in Austria.

References

Strophariaceae
Fungi described in 1989
Fungi of Europe
Taxa named by Rolf Singer